Upcharge is used as the billing counterpart to marketing's upsell. In one context, it means paying a smaller increment in price for a larger increase in what is received; in another it means paying an increase for a non-standard arrangement, what one writer called "upcharge money."

It also may refer to a convenience fee: a pharmacy that carries basic grocery items and charges higher prices for the non-pharmaceutical one-stop-shopping items. While a surcharge is part of what must be paid, an upcharge is not always unexpected, and usually can be declined by rejecting the additional service
or the suggested upgrade, albeit receiving less.

The term upcharge is sometimes used when charge (or possibly surcharge) would suffice, similar to the matter of upsurge compared to the simpler words surge and increase. "Upcharge attraction" is one description of how amusement parks charge both for admission and then for individual rides.

References

Business terms
Pricing